Bagh (also Romanized as Bāgh) is a village in Qaedrahmat Rural District, Zagheh District, Khorramabad County, Lorestan Province, Iran. At the 2006 census, its population was 131, in 25 families.

References 

Towns and villages in Khorramabad County